Precious Find is a 1996 science fiction action film directed by Philippe Mora and starring Rutger Hauer. The film is set on the Moon, in 2049.

Plot
In the future, at Moon City, fate brings three adventurers together: a space ship owner, a young prospector, and a shady entrepreneur who are looking for gold on an asteroid. There they find a mine. After the prospector returns to Moon City to get water, he is followed by two soldiers of fortune, a man and a woman. The two join the three adventures.

Frictions occur because the gold rush gives the entrepreneur a bad temper, the prospector and the woman get romantically involved, a monster attacks, and bandits visit the place. The movie ends with the death of the bandits and the entrepreneur, and the space ship owner, the prospector, and the woman going for new adventures searching for gold.

Cast
Rutger Hauer as Armond Crille
Joan Chen as Camilla Jones
Harold Pruett as Ben Rutherford

External links

1996 films
Moon in film
Films set in 2049
Space adventure films
1990s science fiction action films
Films directed by Philippe Mora
1990s English-language films
American science fiction action films
American adventure films
1990s American films